The Notekillers are an instrumental avant-rock band based out of both Philadelphia and Brooklyn. The current line up consists of David First (Guitar), Stephen Bilenky (Bass), and Barry Halkin (Drums). The band officially began in 1977 and was closely associated with the No Wave acts of New York City at the time. After a nearly thirty-year hiatus, the band has recently released their long-awaited first full-length album We're Here To Help on Prophase Records.

Formation and early history
The Notekillers early history began when high-schoolers David First, Barry Halkin, and Stephen Bilenky began Dead Cheese, a local psychedelic rock band that played small gigs at local Philadelphia clubs and coffee houses between 1968 and 1971. Between 1971 and 1976 the members went their separate ways leaving Dead Cheese behind. During this break David First plays in an ensemble formed by avant-jazz legend Cecil Taylor that performed at Carnegie Hall. Also during this time First studies guitar & jazz theory with renowned instructor Dennis Sandole and analog & computer synthesis through auditing classes at Princeton University. He befriends a grad-student there who admires his nascent constructions and arranges to allow him unlimited access to the largely abandoned classical electronic music studio and tape machines where, driving up from Philadelphia, he creates his first works for the medium in after-hours sessions.

In 1976, after a five-year break Halkin returned to Philadelphia. Halkin and First begin playing together once again. Soon, after years of mostly playing free-improv, First begins creating song-structures for the two of them inspired by what he had been listening to in the ensuing years- minimalist composers, long-time hero John Fahey, free jazz, funk music, reggae & various world musics and the emerging punk rock movement. In early 1977 Halkin & First play their first show – a private party for friends – as Notekillers. In late 1977 Stephen Bilenky joins on bass and the band begins playing in Philadelphia in clubs such as the Hot Club, Artemis, Grendel's Lair, Omni, Starlight Ballroom as well as a few local colleges. Mostly they are met with confusion or disdain, but they make one important ally in David Carroll – Philadelphia's punk rock impresario who continues to book them despite the lack of local support.

The band continues to play, mostly with local Philadelphia bands, but also open up for the Misfits in Bethlehem, Pennsylvania and DNA in Philadelphia. The band was scheduled to open for Sid Vicious, yet a week prior to the show Vicious dies and the show is canceled. In 1978 the band adds a fourth member, Thomas Johnson on congas. Johnson spends various lengths of time with the band, often coming and going from the line-up.

Early releases
After more than two years of rehearsing six nights a week in the basement of Bilenky's father's hair salon (Beauty on a Budget) and being met mostly with resistance from the Philadelphia scene- The Notekillers feel physically and emotionally burnt out. The group decide to record a single with sound man Richard Bloom in a last-ditch attempt at making an impact. After finishing the recording, they take what is planned to be a six-month break to assess their lives and try to allow First to heal from repetitive stress/carpal tunnel syndrome, an ailment that had nagged him since soon after the band's inception. In 1980 The Notekillers release The Zipper b/w Clockwise on their own label – AmericanBushmen Records.

After a subsequent trip to New York City to shop the record to different outlets, store owner/label manager Ed Bahlman of 99 Records contacts the band, booking them for a show in New York City with Glenn Branca. Despite First's hand not having healed the band decides to return from the short hiatus. The band plays shows at Hurrah, CBGB, Maxwell's, amongst other locations in Philadelphia. During this period they play shows with the likes of such bands as The Feelies and The Bush Tetras.

Break Up and hiatus
In 1981, despite getting favorable reviews in NYRocker[1] for the Hurrah show and in The Village Voice[2], Trouser Press[3], and Op Magazine for their single, The Notekiller's stop playing live shows. A second pair of songs, Run Don't Stop/Juggernauts, is recorded but never released. They continued to be cited (often without finding out till years later) after their breakup, including mentions in reference books Volume: International Discography of the New Wave[4], Who's New Wave in Music: An Illustrated Encyclopedia, 1976-1982[5], Between Montmartre and the Mudd Club[6], American Music in the 20th Century[7], and Spin Magazine[8].

In 1982 First leaves Philadelphia and in 1984 moves to NYC and begins to establish himself as composer of experimental music. During this early period time he led bands & ensembles such as Flatland Oscillators, The World Casio Quartet, and The Koan Pool. His ensembles included such artists as violinist Mark Feldman, cellist Jane Scarpantoni, Trumpeter Frank London & Saxophonist Ulrich Krieger. As the 90's began, and up to the present, First continued developing an international reputation, receiving numerous grants, awards and much critical acclaim ("a fascinating artist with a singular technique" in The New York Times, and "a bizarre cross between Hendrix and La Monte Young" in The Village Voice.) for his electronic and instrumental microtonal compositions and guitar improvisations. He performed often in New York as well as throughout Europe. In 1995 he created an opera about the AIDS crisis entitled, The Manhattan Book of the Dead which was presented both in NYC and Potsdam, Germany.

During the hiatus, Halkin continues to build his name and reputation in the Photography community, was the drummer of a band called Devils Grippe and is currently the drummer for a punk band called Kandi Jones based out of Philadelphia. Bilenky starts Bilenky Cycle Works - an internationally renowned bicycle frame boutique shop.

Reformation
After experimenting with adding beats to his drone music for a couple of years and doing some crossing over into the ambient techno scene, First begins in 1998 recording what he calls his "pop" album - Universary - subtitled "Songs, Drones and Refrains of life" that features Jane Scarpantoni, Shelly Hirsch, Michael Blake, Ulrich Krieger, Roy Campbell, Zeena Parkins, Bob Hoffnar, Tom Chiu, and First on guitar, vocals & programming. It is his first foray into songwriting in fifteen years. Unbeknownst to him, during this same period, after a long period of no musical activity, Halkin & Bilenky each independently return to playing in bands - Halkin playing drums in an r&b/soul horn band and Bilenky playing guitar in an original rock band led by his then wife - a singer.

In late 2001 Halkin received a call from an old friend informing him that Thurston Moore mentioned The Notekillers in an article in the winter 2001 issue of Mojo Collections magazine, as part of a mix-tape saying “This is the tape I made for the band when we were starting out” and “we have to find out who these guys are”. First contacted Moore – who he knew from his time spent in the New York City scene, and tells him that he, in fact, was a member of the band. Moore tells First that he used to hang around 99 and that Ed Bahlman played him The Zipper in 1980. Moore asked about other recorded materials as plans are born to release a CD of material on Moore's Ecstatic Peace! label. First - who had remained in contact with Halkin over the years - calls Bilenky to talk to him for the first time in almost 20 years to tell him what's going on.

First proceeds to go through boxes of cassette and reel-to-reel tapes, listening to tracks he hasn't heard in years in order to compile the best possible archival material for the Ecstatic Peace! release.

In 2004 as the album gets closer to release, The Notekillers begin talking about reuniting the band. By summer of the same year, they begin doing shows in the Philadelphia area. In October 2004 The Notekillers perform at a release party at Tonic in New York City.  The bill included Thurston Moore, Jim O’Rourke, Maryanne Amacher, Magik Markers, and Mouthus. In the ensuing years since the release of Notekillers 1977-1981, there were two SXSW shows, multiple shows with Tortoise, Mayo Thompson, Enon, Gary Lucas' Gods & Monsters and  participation in All Tomorrow's Parties – the Nightmare Before Christmas - a three-day festival curated by Thurston Moore at Butlins in the UK.

Work on their soon to be released return We're Here To Help started in early 2006. Two songs were recorded at their rehearsal studio and released to radio  as well as digitally - Airport & Ants. Two more tracks Papers & Rebuttal were recorded during this period but were never released. Work ceased at that point when their recording engineer left town suddenly. In the fall of 2006, four more tracks were recorded in Manayunk, Pa. - Crash, Flamenco, Foster and Jumper. Nothing more happened until the fall of 2007 when some new songs were developed and recorded at their studio - Modern Jazz, Dreambook and Misslebones. Work began in earnest to finish all tracks and release the new album. Guest artists were included on some tracks - including Shelly Hirsch, voice, Lenny Pickett, baritone sax, and John Clark, French horn. First does major reworkings of basic songs by overdubbing guitars and electronics. During this time, the album cover - conceived by First and Halkin is created. Front cover drawings are commissioned from two cartoon artists Halkin meets at a local punk rock book fair and the back cover photograph is taken by Halkin. The front and back is designed by Sara Hodgson.

All track mixing is finished by the fall of 2008. They begin mixing anew with new mixing engineer, Steve Silverstein (Christmas Decorations, The Bleaks, a.o.). After mixing and mastering is completed, the band is decidedly unsatisfied, deciding that though the tracks are good, the overdubs don't represent enough what they do as a live band. They decided to shelve the album for the time being, completely start over and during the summer of 2009 - with Steve Silverstein doing the recording - Notekillers record a mixture of brand new tracks and newer versions of some of the previous songs that they are finally happy with. In the winter of 2009 a much sparer set of overdubs is completed and in early 2010 mixing is begun by sound engineer Yianni Papadopoulos. Mixing is completed on April 12, 2010. Sadly, Yianni Papadopoulos dies suddenly of a heart attack at age 43 the next day. The album was released in the fall of 2010 on Prophase Records (http://prophasemusic.com/default.aspx/).

Recently the Notekillers contributed a track - Cream Puff War - to a Grateful Dead tribute album TBR in the fall of 2011 by Prophase Records.

External links
Official site
Pitchfork interview w/Notekillers guitarist David First
Pitchfork review of We're Here to Help
Review in Deli Magazine
Review of David First XI CD in New Music Box
Phila Inquirer Sunday Arts & Entertainment Article
Review of Notekillers in Wired Magazine - SXSW Bands that Blew Us Away
NYTimes Review of Notekillers Ecstatic Peace Album 
Village Voice Review
Dusted Magazine Review
Phila City Paper Article
Notekillers Ecstatic Peace webpage   
NY Nighttrain Article

References
[1] Glenn Branca/Notekillers/Hurrah - NY Rocker, November 1980 (David Bither author)
[2] Glenn Branca/Notekillers/Hurrah - The Village Voice, July 30, 1980 (Jon Pareles author)
[3] American Underground record review - Trouser Press, September 1980 (Tim Sommers author)
[4] B. George (Editor), Martha DeFoe, Pam Meyer (Illustrator) 110 Records publisher, 1981 
[5] Bianco, David (author), Pierian Press, 1985. (entry #496/pg. 153)
[6] Bernard Gendron (author) University of Chicago Press, 2002
[7] Kyle Gann (author) Schirmer Books, 1997.
[8] The Best 100 Bands I've Never Seen Mentioned in Spin, November 1993 - Byron Coley (author)

Musical groups established in 1977
Musical groups from Brooklyn
Musical groups from Philadelphia
Rock music groups from New York (state)